A gremlin is a mischievous folkloric creature invented at the beginning of the 20th century to originally explain malfunctions in aircraft, and later in other machinery, processes, and their operators. Depictions of these creatures vary widely. Stories about them and references to them as the causes of especially inexplicable technical and mental problems of pilots were especially popular during and after World War II.

Use of the term in the sense of a mischievous creature that sabotages aircraft first arose in Royal Air Force (RAF) slang among British pilots stationed in Malta, the Middle East, and India in the 1920s, with the earliest printed record in a poem published in the journal Aeroplane in Malta on 10 April 1929. Later sources have sometimes claimed that the concept goes back to World War I, but there is no print evidence of this.

There is evidence of earlier RAF reference in the 1920s to a lowly menial person, in other words a low-ranking officer or enlisted man saddled with oppressive assignments.

Aviation origins
Although their origin is found in myths among airmen claiming that gremlins were responsible for sabotaging aircraft, the folklorist John W. Hazen states that some people derive the name from the Old English word gremian, "to vex", while Carol Rose, in her book Spirits, Fairies, Leprechauns, and Goblins: An Encyclopedia, attributes the name to a portmanteau of Grimm's Fairy Tales and Fremlin Beer. According to Paul Quinion, it is plausible that the term is a blend of the word "goblin" with the name of the manufacturer of the most common beer available in the RAF in the 1920s, Fremlin.

An early reference to the gremlin is in aviator Pauline Gower's 1938 novel The ATA: Women with Wings, where Scotland is described as "gremlin country", a mystical and rugged territory where scissor-wielding gremlins cut the wires of biplanes when unsuspecting pilots were about. An article by Hubert Griffith in the servicemen's fortnightly Royal Air Force Journal dated 18 April 1942, also chronicles the appearance of gremlins, although the article states the stories had been in existence for several years, with later recollections of it having been told by Battle of Britain Spitfire pilots as early as 1940.

This concept of gremlins was popularized during World War II among airmen of the Royal Air Force (RAF) units, in particular the men of the high-altitude Photographic Reconnaissance Units (PRU) of RAF Benson, RAF Wick and RAF St Eval. The flight crews blamed gremlins for otherwise inexplicable accidents which sometimes occurred during their flights. Gremlins were also thought at one point to have enemy sympathies, but investigations revealed that enemy aircraft had similar and equally inexplicable mechanical problems. As such, gremlins were portrayed as equal opportunity tricksters, taking no sides in the conflict, but acting out their mischief from their own self-interest. In reality, the gremlins were a form of "buck passing" or deflecting blame. This led John Hazen to note that "the gremlin has been looked on as new phenomenon, a product of the machine age – the age of air". The concept of gremlins as a scapegoat was important to the morale of pilots according to the author and historian Marlin Bressi:  Examples of Gremlins can be seen in the IBCC Digital Archive.

Popularization by Roald Dahl

British author Roald Dahl is credited with getting the gremlins known outside the Royal Air Force. He would have been familiar with the myth, having carried out his military service in 80 Squadron of the Royal Air Force in the Middle East. Dahl had his own experience in an accidental crash-landing in the Western Desert when he ran out of fuel. In January 1942, he was transferred to Washington, D.C. as Assistant Air attaché at the British Embassy. It was there that he wrote his first children's novel, The Gremlins, in which "Gremlins" were tiny men who lived on RAF fighters. In the same novel, Dahl called the wives of gremlins "Fifinellas", their male children "Widgets", and their female children "Flibbertigibbets". Dahl showed the finished manuscript to Sidney Bernstein, the head of the British Information Service, who came up with the idea to send it to Walt Disney.

The manuscript arrived in Disney's hands in July 1942, and he considered using it as material for a live action/animated full-length feature film, offering Dahl a contract. The film project was changed to an animated feature and entered pre-production, with characters "roughed out" and storyboards created. Disney managed to have the story published in the December 1942 issue of Cosmopolitan magazine. At Dahl's urging, in early 1943, a revised version of the story, again titled The Gremlins, was published as a picture book by Random House. (It was later updated and re-published in 2006 by Dark Horse Comics).

The 1943 publication of The Gremlins by Random House consisted of 50,000 copies, with Dahl ordering 50 copies for himself as promotional material for himself and the upcoming film, handing them out to everyone he knew, including the British ambassador in Washington Lord Halifax, and the US First Lady Eleanor Roosevelt who read it to her grandchildren. The book was considered an international success with 30,000 more sold in Australia but initial efforts to reprint the book were precluded by a wartime paper shortage. Reviewed in major publications, Dahl was considered a writer-of-note and his appearances in Hollywood to follow up with the film project were met with notices in Hedda Hopper's columns.

The film project was reduced to an animated short and eventually cancelled in August 1943, when copyright and RAF rights could not be resolved. But thanks mainly to Disney, the story had its share of publicity, which helped in introducing the concept to a wider audience. Issues #33–41 of Walt Disney's Comics and Stories published between June 1943 and February 1944 contained a nine-episode series of short silent stories featuring a Gremlin Gus as their star. The first was drawn by Vivie Risto, and the rest of them by Walt Kelly. This served as their introduction to the comic book audience as they are human gremlins who lived in their own village as little flying human people.

While Roald Dahl was famous for making gremlins known worldwide, many returning Air Servicemen swear they saw creatures tinkering with their equipment. One crewman swore he saw one before an engine malfunction that caused his B-25 Mitchell bomber to rapidly lose altitude, forcing the aircraft to return to base. Folklorist Hazen likewise offers his own alleged eyewitness testimony of these creatures, which appeared in an academically praised and peer-reviewed publication, describing an occasion he found "a parted cable which bore obvious tooth marks in spite of the fact that the break occurred in a most inaccessible part of the plane". At this point, Hazen states he heard "a gruff voice" demand, "How many times must you be told to obey orders and not tackle jobs you aren't qualified for? – This is how it should be done." Upon which Hazen heard a "musical twang" and another cable was parted.

Critics of this idea state that the stress of combat and the dizzying heights caused such hallucinations, often believed to be a coping mechanism of the mind to help explain the many problems aircraft faced whilst in combat.

In media

Film
 In 1943, Bob Clampett directed Falling Hare, a Merrie Melodies cartoon featuring Bugs Bunny. Inspired by Roald Dahl's book and Walt Disney's proposed film, this short is one of the earliest films to include multiple gremlins, though only one was consequential.  It features Bugs Bunny in conflict with a gremlin at an airfield. It was followed in 1944 by Russian Rhapsody, another Merrie Melodies short showing Russian gremlins sabotaging an aircraft piloted by Adolf Hitler. The gremlin in "Falling Hare" has a color scheme reflecting one used on U.S. Army Air Forces training aircraft of the time, using dark blue (as on such an aircraft's fuselage) and a deep orange-yellow color (as used on the wings and tail surfaces).
 The 1944 romantic comedy Johnny Doesn't Live Here Any More had animated gremlins with an uncredited Mel Blanc providing the voice.
 The 1981 animated film Heavy Metal contains a segment titled "B-17" had creatures referred to as "Gremlins" in which the sole surviving pilot of a battle weary aircraft is ravaged by the reanimated corpses of his fellow crew.
 The 1984 film Gremlins, produced by Steven Spielberg and directed by Joe Dante, is loosely inspired by Roald Dahl's characters, featuring evil and destructive monsters which mutate from small furry creatures. Murray Futterman, a WWII veteran calls the creatures "Real Gremlins". A sequel followed in 1990, called Gremlins 2: The New Batch.
 In Cast a Deadly Spell, a 1991 HBO television film, gremlins are said to have been "brought back from the pacific" to the United States in World War II and are seen damaging cars and houses.
 In Madagascar: Escape 2 Africa (2008), Alex sees Mort (mistaking him for a gremlin) messing with the engine and falling off the aircraft.
In the movie franchise Hotel Transylvania the gremlins are seen as guests of the monster hotel built by Count Dracula.
A batlike gremlin appears in the 2020 film Shadow in the Cloud. The film starts with a depiction of gremlins in WW II circa posters as a creative scapegoat used by airmen to deflect negligence in maintenance and responsibility for their aircraft. Once the protagonist boards the aircraft, she finds an actual gremlin is sabotaging the aircraft. The creature looks like a cross between a large bat with razor-sharp claws and a monkey with a long tail. The gremlin sabotages the aircraft by taking out an engine, attacking the protagonist in the lower turret and another crew member in the upper turret.

Television

 A 1963 episode of The Twilight Zone, "Nightmare at 20,000 Feet" directed by Richard Donner and based on the short story of the same name by Richard Matheson, featured a gremlin attacking an airliner. In the original television episode, the gremlin appears as a stocky ape-like creature which inspects the aircraft's wing with the curiosity of an animal before damaging it. William Shatner plays a passenger named Bob Wilson (just recovered from a mental breakdown) who sees the gremlin (played by Nick Cravat) on the aircraft's wing as he tries to warn the stewardess and other airplane staff members about it. Upon realizing that the Gremlin's work on the wing would cause the airplane to crash, Bob steals a sleeping sky marshal's revolver and causes a breach in the auxiliary exit to shoot the Gremlin. When the airplane lands, Bob is removed from the aircraft on a stretcher in a straitjacket. Rod Serling narrates that Bob Wilson's conviction will not be long as the final scene shows that the Gremlin left evidence of Bob's claim in the form of a damaged wing. This episode was remade as a segment of Twilight Zone: The Movie (1983) with John Lithgow playing a similar character called John Valentine. John Valentine (who is depicted as suffering from aviatophobia) sees the gremlin and tries to warn the people on the airplane as the gremlin intentionally damages the wing. After stealing an airplane security guard's gun and breaking open his window, John opens fire on the gremlin which defends itself by breaking the gun and flies away when the airplane nears the airport. John is taken away in a straitjacket as the maintenance crew discovers unexplained damages and claw marks on the wing to the surprise of the passengers nearby.
 The 1975 Doctor Who serial "The Ark In Space" is set on a supposedly impervious, yet now decrepit space station. In it, the Doctor's companion Harry Sullivan explains the station's fate, saying, "Gremlins can get into everything, old girl. First law of the sea."
 A gremlin makes an appearance in a Halloween special of The Simpsons (original airdate: 28 October 1993) paralleling The Twilight Zones "Nightmare at 20,000 Feet", (the segment is even named "Terror at 5½ Feet") in which the gremlin (with its vocal effects provided by Frank Welker) attempts to destroy the wheel of Bart Simpson's school bus. Bart ends up using a flare gun to get it off the bus only for it land on Ned Flanders's car. Bart is taken away in a straitjacket and later sees the gremlin outside of the ambulance holding Ned's severed but still living head.
 The Eek! The Cat episode "The Eex Files" (original airdate: 5 November 1994) starts out with Eek on an aircraft beside a man claiming to see someone outside on the wing. Of course when he looks, there is no one there. At the end of the episode, Eek is dropped off by an alien on the wing of the aircraft and meets the gremlin, then promptly offers to help him "find his wallet". The final scene shows the half-crazed man looking out the window and "spazzing out" when he sees them both tearing up the wing.
 A Tiny Toon Adventures special titled "Night Ghoulery" (original airdate: 25 August 1995) includes a spoof of Night Gallery, with Babs Bunny presenting in Rod Serling's style. It has a segment named "Gremlin on a Wing", which parodies "Nightmare at 20,000 Feet", with Plucky Duck in William Shatner's place, accompanied by Hamton J. Pig in an aircraft, and a gremlin similar to that which appeared in the Bugs Bunny short Falling Hare.
 In the Johnny Bravo episode "The Man Who Cried Clown" (original airdate: 8 December 1997), which is part of "The Zone Where Normal Things Don't Happen Very Often," Johnny sees an evil clown on the wing of the aircraft and is having difficulty convincing the pilots and anyone of its existence which even included a cameo by someone resembling William Shatner who quotes "Oh no you don't! I'm not falling for that again." When he catches and beats up the clown in the airplane's restroom, he is confronted and informed by a pilot that the clown in question and another clown were needed to keep the aircraft in balance during flight. The pilots and some nearby people beat up Johnny and make him take the incapacitated clown's place.
 At the end of episode 9 of Muppets Tonight, Miss Piggy sees a gremlin outside of her airplane window. William Shatner is seen sitting next to her as he claims that he has been complaining about the gremlin for years, but nobody does anything about it.
 The Real Ghostbusters episode "Don't Forget the Motor City" (original airdate: 3 December 1987) has the Ghostbusters traveling to Detroit to battle gremlins who are sabotaging a factory run by a fictional analog of General Motors.
In Danger Mouse, the gremlin is illogical.
 A gremlin appears in the Are You Afraid of the Dark? episode "The Tale of the Curious Camera" (March 2, 1994). After getting his portraits back from the basketball team, Matt finds that he didn't show up in the photos. To make it up to him, the photographer gives him an antique camera because it has apparently chosen him. Matt soon learns that anything or anyone he takes a picture of will have something bad happen to it whether he wants it or not. It is discovered that a gremlin inhabits the camera.
 In the Thomas The Tank Engine & Friends episode "Gordon and the Gremlin" (original airdate: 16 September 1998), gremlins are blamed for Gordon's fire not lighting and problems with the turntable.
 In the Extreme Ghostbusters episode "Grease" (original airdate: 25 September 1997), the Ghostbusters have to capture a gremlin that was damaging New York's machines, while at the same time the FBI believes them to be the cause of the sabotage.
 In So Weird (1999), the gang stop at a town called "Simplicity" where gremlins are destroying everything mechanical. In the fiction of the episode, gremlins were the original inventors and were upset with humans for taking their technology for granted. The gremlins are only appeased by the gang re-writing a locally based tech conglomerate's jingle to be about simple living.
 In the cartoon series American Dragon: Jake Long, the episode "Jake Takes the Cake" (original airdate: 26 August 2005) features gremlins who mess with any type of mechanical devices and cause a lot of trouble until they are put to sleep and captured.
 The 2013 entry for the Kamen Rider series titled Kamen Rider Wizard features a Phantom known as Gremlin. His human name Sora is Japanese for "sky", possibly an allusion to planes. He wields a pair of swords modeled after scissor blades, reflecting the claims that gremlins use scissors to cut wires in biplanes.
 The Ben 10 alien, Juryrigg, looks like a gremlin and is known to break down and modify machines.
 The 2010 Super Sentai series, Tensou Sentai Goseiger featured the antagonistic cryptid-themed monster group Yuumajuu. One of their members is the bratty Waraikozou of the Gremlin, who has the secondary theme of flea. Like stereotypical gremlins, Waraikozou is capable of destroying mechanical objects.
 Mr. Bogus are a gremlin like and based on the French / Belgian clay animation series of shorts simply titled, Bogus.
 An animated television series based on the 1984 film, Gremlins, is being produced for HBO Max, entitled Gremlins: Secrets of the Mogwai. It is set for a 2023 release date following delays, and will also air on Cartoon Network under their ACME Night programming block. It serves as a sort of prequel to the original films, expanding on the lore of the small furry creatures known as Mogwai, who painfully multiply when wet and become evil Gremlins when fed after midnight, as well as how the Wing family, namely 10 year old Sam, came into possession of Gizmo.

Radio
 On 21 December 1942, CBS aired "Gremlins", a whimsical story written by Lucille Fletcher, on an episode of Orson Welles's patriotic radio series Ceiling Unlimited. U.S. Army Air Forces officers discuss their experiences with the irritating creatures, and conclude that feeding them transforms them into an asset rather than a hindrance to aviation.
 On Dec 3, 2021, Tasgeel Podcast produced a Gremlin influenced short audio film "The Trip".

Music
 On Robert Calvert's 1974 concept album Captain Lockheed and the Starfighters, the Song of the Gremlin and the Song of the Gremlin Part 2, describing how gremlins sabotage all man's attempts to fly.

Literature
 The 1947 novel by Roald Dahl, Sometime Never: A Fable for Supermen, had the Gremlin leader as the protagonist of the second half of the book. He is described as leading an ancient nature-loving race away from the wars between humans and trying to let his race survive the destruction of humanity.
 The first issue of the Monster in My Pocket comic book series has Gremlin prominently among the good monsters.  He is able to create fire from his fingertips.  In the second through fourth issues, this power is given to Hobgoblin, and Gremlin is never seen again.
 In the micro-series of the My Little Pony: Friendship Is Magic comic book series, there is a species called Cloud Gremlins, which cast a spell in Ponyville. In the end, they are defeated by Rainbow Dash.
 In The Paladin Prophecy, the main character is attacked while on a plane, by creatures he calls “gremlins”
Gremlin Americanus: A Scrap Book Collection of Gremlins by artist and pilot Eric Sloane may predate the Roald Dahl publication. Published in 1942 by B.F. Jay & Co, the central characters are characterized as "pixies of the air" and are friends of both RAF and USAAF pilots. The gremlins are mischievous and give pilots a great deal of trouble, but they have never been known to cause fatal accidents but can be blamed for any untoward incident or "bonehead play", qualities that endear them to all flyers.
Ssh! Gremlins by H.W., illustrated by Ronald Neighbour ("Neb" of the Daily Maily), published in 1942 by H. W. John Crowther Publication, England, features numerous humorous illustrations describing the gremlins as whimsical but essentially friendly folk. According to "H.W.", contrary to some reports, gremlins are a universal phenomenon and by no means only the friends of flying men.

Card games
 In the 2016 released set of Magic: The Gathering, Kaladesh, Gremlins (portrayed as four-armed, human-sized mammals with anteater-like snouts) appear on the technologically progressive plane and destroy the artifacts and inventions of many people on the plane, and are considered a public safety hazard. This was the first gremlin card in Magic since Gremlin Mine printed in the 2011 set New Phyrexia. Prior to that, the earliest gremlin card was Phyrexian Gremlins printed in the 1994  Antiquities set.
 In the Yu-Gi-Oh! Trading Card Game, the cards "Feral Imp", "Des Feral Imp" and "King of the Feral Imps" are based on gremlins.

Video games
 In 1984, the video game Gremlins was released as a tie-in to the film of the same name.
 In 1990, Gremlins 2: The New Batch was released, also a tie-in to the film of the same name.
 Gremlin is the boss of stage four, "Towering Catastrophe" in the 1992 Monster in My Pocket video game.  He rides a crane hook onto the screen, throws three round objects, then rides off the screen, and can come and go from the top or either sioe of the screen.  Apart from always initially appearing from the top, his direction is randomised.  He himself must be dodged, although the hook itself passes behind the player.  If the final blow is struck while the crane is in motion, Gremlin is flung farther off the crane.  As with the other bosses, he seeks a rematch near the end of the game.   Othar than the playable characters, Vampire and the Monster (of Frankenstein), the 14 monsters explicitly established as on the "good" side led by Vampire (which was said to outnumber the "evil" side led by Warlock) are all omitted from the game except for Gremlin and Hobgoblin, who both appear as enemies to the good monsters in stage four.
 In the Epic Mickey games (2010, 2012), Gremlins assist Mickey Mouse after he releases them.
 In Spiral Knights (2011), Gremlins serve as an enemy faction and multiple different enemies.
 In the 2016 video game XCOM 2, the Specialist soldier class utilises drones called GREMLINs for a range of actions in combat.
 In Pokémon Sword and Shield, Impidimp and Morgrem are Dark/Fairy type Pokémon based on the gremlin.
 In Dwarf Fortress, the gremlins are small intelligent underground creatures that can cause great disorder by playing with levers.
 In Heroes of Might and Magic 3, gremlins are recruitable troops from the town, Tower.

See also
 Fearsome critters folkloric creatures that arose contemporaneously with that of the gremlin
 Femlins, female gremlins featured in Playboy magazine
 Fifinella
 Froggy the Gremlin, a character on an American TV show in the 1950s
 Gremlin Graphics, the now defunct video games studio
 Gremlins, a 1984 dark fantasy black comedy monster film, and the 1990 science fantasy comedy-drama sequel Gremlins 2: The New Batch
 Jinn
 Klabautermann
 Kobold
 Machine Elf
 AMC Gremlin

References

Notes

Citations

Bibliography

 Carson, Rick. Taming Your Gremlin: A Surprisingly Simple Method for Getting Out of Your Own Way. Minneapolis, Minnesota: Quill, 2003. .
 Conant, Jennet. The Irregulars: Roald Dahl and the British Spy Ring in Wartime Washington. New York: Simon & Schuster, 2008. .
 Dahl, Flight Lieutenant Roald. The Gremlins: The Lost Walt Disney Production. Milwaukie, Oregon: Dark Horse Books, 2006 (reprint and updated copy of 1943 original publication). .
 De La Rue, Keith. "Gremlins." delarue.net, updated 23 August 2004. Retrieved: 11 October 2010.
 Donald, Graeme. Sticklers, Sideburns & Bikinis: The Military Origins of Everyday Words and Phrases. Oxford, UK: Osprey Publishing, 2008. .
 Gower, Pauline. The ATA: Women with Wings. London: J. Long, limited, 1938.
 "Gremlins." Fantastic Fiction, a British online book site/biography source. Retrieved: 11 October 2010.
 Hazen, John W.  "Gremlin." Funk and Wagnalls Standard Dictionary of Folklore, Mythology and Legend. New York: Funk and Wagnalls, 1972. .
 Merry, Lois K. Women Military Pilots of World War II: A History with Biographies of American, British, Russian and German Aviators. Jefferson, North Carolina: McFarland & Company Inc., 2010. .
 Sasser, Sanford, Jr., ed. The Illustrated Encyclopedia of Aviation and Space, Volume 6. Los Angeles: A.F.E. Press, 1971, p. 1094. .
 Smith, Ronald L. Horror Stars on Radio: The Broadcast Histories of 29 Chilling Hollywood Voices. Jefferson, North Carolina:  McFarland & Company Inc., 2010'. .
 Sturrock, Donald. Storyteller: The Authorized Biography of Roald Dahl. New York: Simon & Schuster, 2010. .

External links

Gremlins, Sea Bats, Fobbits and Goanna Farms An Article on Wartime Myths
Gremlins at Don Markstein's Toonopedia. Archived from the original on September 1, 2016.
The Inducks' list of Gremlin appearances in Disney comics

 
English folklore
English legendary creatures
Fairies
Fantasy creatures
Goblins
In-jokes
Technology folklore